Dmytro Kryzhanovskyy (Ukrainian: Дмитро Крижановський, also transliterated Dmitry Kryzhanovskiy) is a paralympic swimmer from Ukraine competing mainly in category S5 events.

Dmitry has competed in two paralympics for Ukraine winning a total of four medals including one gold.  His first games were the 2004 Summer Paralympics where he competed in the 50m butterfly finishing fifth, winning silver in both the 50 m and 100 m freestyle behind Spain's Sebastián Rodríguez Veloso who set a new world record in both events.  His second games were the 2008 Summer Paralympics where he competed as part of the 20pt 4×50 m medley where the Ukrainian team finished fifth, he also finished second again in the 100 m freestyle this time behind Brazil's Daniel Dias who broke the old world record before beating Daniel into silver medal position in the 50 m freestyle.

References

External links
 

Paralympic swimmers of Ukraine
Swimmers at the 2004 Summer Paralympics
Swimmers at the 2008 Summer Paralympics
Paralympic gold medalists for Ukraine
Paralympic silver medalists for Ukraine
Ukrainian male freestyle swimmers
Living people
Swimmers at the 2012 Summer Paralympics
Medalists at the 2004 Summer Paralympics
Medalists at the 2008 Summer Paralympics
S5-classified Paralympic swimmers
Year of birth missing (living people)
Paralympic medalists in swimming
21st-century Ukrainian people